5β-Dihydrotestosterone (5β-DHT), also known as 5β-androstan-17β-ol-3-one or as etiocholan-17β-ol-3-one, is an etiocholane (5β-androstane) steroid as well as an inactive metabolite of testosterone formed by 5β-reductase in the liver and bone marrow and an intermediate in the formation of 3α,5β-androstanediol and 3β,5β-androstanediol (by 3α- and 3β-hydroxysteroid dehydrogenase) and, from them, respectively, etiocholanolone and epietiocholanolone (by 17β-hydroxysteroid dehydrogenase). Unlike its isomer 5α-dihydrotestosterone (5α-DHT or simply DHT), 5β-DHT either does not bind to or binds only very weakly to the androgen receptor. 5β-DHT is notable among metabolites of testosterone in that, due to the fusion of the A and B rings in the cis orientation, it has an extremely angular molecular shape, and this could be related to its lack of androgenic activity. 5β-DHT, unlike 5α-DHT, is also inactive in terms of neurosteroid activity, although its metabolite, etiocholanolone, does possess such activity.

See also
 3α-Androstanediol
 3β-Androstanediol
 Androsterone
 Epiandrosterone

References

Etiocholanes
Human metabolites